Blood and Fire is a British reggae record label specialising in reissues of 1970s dub.

History
Steve Barrow, Bob Harding, Mick Hucknall, Elliot Rashman and Andy Dodd formed the record label in Manchester in 1993 with the objective of reissuing roots reggae, dub and DJ albums with the integrity of jazz reissues. In the process, Blood and Fire influenced the overall aesthetic of other labels issuing archival Jamaican recordings in the 1990s and beyond.

Initial releases drew on mid-1970s Bunny Lee produced material but the label subsequently reissued material produced by Yabby You and Glen Brown along with the Lee "Scratch" Perry produced Congos set Heart of the Congos and a three-CD Big Youth set, Natty Universal Dread.

Despite the reissue objective, the label released two one-riddim albums. The first was Tree of Satta (2003) which used the original "Satta Massagana" riddim featuring a mixture of new and vintage voicings over the riddim along with the original version of the song by The Abyssinians. The second, Fisherman Style (2006), used The Congos' "Fisherman" riddim and featured new material from a variety of singers including Horace Andy, U Roy, Big Youth, Luciano, Tony Tuff and Dillinger.

The label also had a sound system which has featured original Jamaican artists such as Dilinger, Trinity, Ranking Joe, U Brown, Horace Andy, Dennis Alcapone, U Roy, Spikey Tee, Country Culture, Raggamonica along with Steve Barrow and Dom Sotgiu. In July 2006 the sound went to Japan with U Roy on a three date sell out tour.

In 2007, news leaked out via the company's popular message board that Blood and Fire had stopped trading as an active company. The loss of their American and French distributors due to bankruptcy as well as some unfortunate management decisions, combined with an industry-wide decline in sales, were to blame. Although the company declined to make any official announcement, it was effectively out of business.

In 2014 it was announced that the label would be relaunched in conjunction with VP Records, with Barrow overseeing future projects.

Discography

1994
BAFCD/LP001 – The Dreads at King Tubby's – If Deejay Was your Trade
BAFCD/LP002 – King Tubby and Friends – Dub Gone Crazy
BAFCD/LP003 – Keith Hudson – Pick a Dub
BAFCD/LP004 – Burning Spear – Social Living
BAFCD/LP005 – Yabby U – King Tubby's Prophesy of Dub

1995
BAFCD/LP006, BAFLP007 – Horace Andy – In The Light / In The Light Dub
BAFCD007 – Various Artists – Heavyweight Sound
BAFCD/LP008 – Tapper Zukie – Tappa Zukie in Dub

1996
BAFCD/LP009 – The Congos – Heart of the Congos (2-CD)
BAFCD/LP010 – Jah Stitch – Original Raggamuffin 1975–1977
BAFCD1001 – King Tubby & Scientist – Greenwich Farm Rub-A-Dub
BAFCD/LP011 – King Tubby & Soul Syndicate – Freedom Sounds in Dub
BAFCD/LP012 – Scientist – Dub in the Roots Tradition
BAFCD/LP013 – King Tubby & Prince Jammy – Dub Gone 2 Crazy
BAFCD/LP014 – Prince Alla – Only Love Can Conquer
BAFCD/LP015 – Glen Brown & King Tubby – Termination Dub 1973–1979

1997
BAFCD/LP016 – I-Roy – Don't Check Me With No Lightweight Stuff 1972–1975
BAFCD017 – Various Artists – 2 Heavyweight: Another Blood and Fire Sampler
BAFCD/LP018 – Morwell Unlimited Meet King Tubby's – Dub Me
BAFCD/LP019 – Horace Andy – Good Vibes
BFCDS903 – Various Artists – Dubwise and Otherwise: A Blood and Fire Audio Catalogue
BAFCD/LP020 – U Brown – Train To Zion
BAFCD/LP021 – Yabby You – Jesus Dread 1972–1977 (2-CD) 
BAFCD/LPO22 – Yabby you – Jesus Dread 1995–1997 (2-CDE)

1998
BAFCD/LP022 – Impact Allstars – Forward The Bass: Dub From Randy's 1972–1975
BAFCD/LP023 – Junior Byles and Friends – 129 Beat Street: Ja-Man Special 1975–1978
BAFCD/LP024 – Johnny Clarke – Dreader Dread 1976–1978

1999
BAFCD025 – Various Artists – Heavyweight 3: A Blood and Fire Sampler
BAFCD/LP026 – King Tubby & Friends – Dub Like Dirt 1975–1977
BAFCD/LP027 – Max Romeo – Open The Iron Gate 1973–1977
BAFCD028 – The Chantells & Friends – Children of Jah 1977–1979
BAFCD/LP029 – Inner Circle & The Fatman Riddim Section – Heavyweight Dub / Killer Dub
BFCDS904 – The Dubmasters – X-Ray Music: A Blood and Fire Dub Directory

2000
BAFCD/LP030 – Cornell Campbell – I Shall Not Remove 1975–1980
BAFCD/LP031 – Trinity – Shanty Town Determination
BAFCD/LP032 – Linval Thompson – Ride on Dreadlocks 1975–1977
BAFCD/LP033 – Sylford Walker & Welton Irie – Lamb's Bread International

2001
BAFCD/LP034 – Big Youth – Natty Universal Dread 1973–1979 (3-CD)
BAFCD035 – Gregory Isaacs – Mr Isaacs
BAFCD/LP036 – Darker Than Blue: Soul From Jamdown, 1973-1977
BAFCD/LP037 – Niney the Observer – Microphone Attack 1974–1977

2002
BAFCD/LP038 – Yabby You – Dub it to the Top 1976–1979
BAFCD/LP039 – Dennis Brown – The Promised Land 1977–1979
BAFCD040 – Prince Alla & Junior Ross – I Can Hear The Children Singing 1975–1978
BFCDS905 – Various Artists – Dubwise And Otherwise 2: A Blood and Fire Audio Catalogue

2003
BAFCD041 – Ja-Man Allstars – In The Dub Zone
BAFCD/LP042 – Jackie Mittoo – Champion in the Arena 1976–1977
BAFCD/LP043 – Ranking Joe – Zion High
BAFCD/LP044 – Tommy McCook – Blazing Horns / Tenor in Roots

2004
BAFCD/LP045 – The Abyssinians and Friends – The Tree of Satta Vol 01
BAFCD/LP046 – Dennis Brown Presents Prince Jammy – Umoja / 20th Century DEBwise

2005
BAFCD047 – Blood and Fire All Stars – Run It Red
BAFCD/LP048 – Willi Williams – Messenger Man
BAFCD/LP049 – Prince Far I – Silver & Gold 1973–1979

2006
BAFCD/LP050 – The Congos and Friends – Fisherman Style
BAFCD/LP051 – Yabby You – Deliver Me From My Enemies

2007
BFCDS906 – Blood and Fire Allstars – Singerman!

2014
VPBAF6524 – Gregory Isaacs – "Mr. Know It All/War of the Stars" (12")

See also 
 Lists of record labels

References

External links
 

British record labels
Reggae record labels
Record labels established in 1993
Music in Manchester